Aliabad (also Romanized as ‘Alīābād; also known as Shāh ‘Alī) is a village in Khaveh-ye Jonubi Rural District, in the Central District of Delfan County, Lorestan Province, Iran. At the 2006 census, its population was 102, in 23 families.

References 

Towns and villages in Delfan County